Richard Cattell may refer to:
 Richard Cattell (rugby union)
 Richard Cattell (surgeon)